Harold Collins may refer to:
Harold Collins (strongman) (born 1957), American strongman and powerlifter
Harold Collins (Australian politician) (1887–1962), politician in Queensland, Australia
Harold Collins (Canadian politician) (1925–2015), Canadian politician
Hal Collins (Harold L. Collins), American football coach

See also
Harry Collins (disambiguation)